Alan Epstein (February 12, 1949 – June 20, 2016) was an American author who wrote four books, including the travel book As The Romans Do, which was featured on The Oprah Winfrey Show.

References

1949 births
American travel writers
American male non-fiction writers
2016 deaths
Place of birth missing